The French 5th Light Cavalry Division was a French Army division active during World War II. It was led by Lieut. General Baron Subervie.

World War 2

Battle Of France
During the Battle of France in May 1940 the division contained the following units:

6th Cavalry Brigade
11th Cuirassier Regiment
12th Chasseurs a Cheval Regiment
15th Light Mechanized Brigade
5th Armoured Car Regiment
15th Mechanized Dragoon Regiment
78th Artillery Regiment

It was a newly formed division.

References

5
Cavalry divisions of France